Virsa may refer to:

People
 Virsa Singh (born 1933), Indian athlete
 Virsa Singh Valtoha, Indian politician

Other
 Virsa (film)
 Virsa Systems